The Canary Wharf Squash Classic 2014 is the 2014's Canary Wharf Squash Classic, which is a tournament of the PSA World Tour event International (Prize money : 50 000 $). The event took place at the East Wintergarden in London in England from 24 March to 28 March. Nick Matthew won his fourth Canary Wharf Squash Classic trophy, beating James Willstrop in the final.

Prize money and ranking points
For 2014, the prize purse was $50,000. The prize money and points breakdown is as follows:

Seeds

Draw and results

See also
PSA World Tour 2014
Canary Wharf Squash Classic
2014 Men's British Open

References

External links
PSA Canary Wharf Squash Classic 2014 website
Canary Wharf Squash Classic 2014 official website

Canary Wharf
Canary Wharf Squash Classic
Canary Wharf Squash Classic
Canary Wharf Squash Classic
Squash competitions in London